Septin-6 is a protein that in humans is encoded by the SEPT6 gene.

Function 

This gene is a member of the septin family of GTPases. Members of this family are required for cytokinesis. This gene encodes four transcript variants encoding three distinct isoforms. An additional transcript variant has been identified, but its biological validity has not been determined.

Clinical significance 

One version of pediatric acute myeloid leukemia is the result of a reciprocal translocation between chromosomes 11 and X, with the breakpoint associated with the genes encoding the mixed-lineage leukemia and septin 2 proteins.

Interactions 

SEPT6 has been shown to interact with SEPT2.

References

Further reading